Mitchell Wilcox (born November 7, 1996) is an American football tight end for the Cincinnati Bengals of the National Football League (NFL). He played college football at South Florida.

Early life
Wilcox, born in Largo, Florida, is the youngest child in the family to Chuck and Carole Wilcox. Wilcox's father served in the US Coast Guard, reaching the rank of Commander. Wilcox's grandfather also served in the US Coast Guard, reaching the rank of Captain. Wilcox attended Tarpon Springs High School and was a standout two-sport athlete. His senior year he helped his varsity basketball team reach their first ever FHSAA Final Four in school history. Averaging 5.8 ppg, 5.1 rpg, and 0.8 apg. Wilcox played alongside Hapoel Haifa's Scottie James.

College career
Wilcox was a member of the South Florida Bulls for five seasons, redshirting his true freshman season. Wilcox finished his collegiate career with 100 receptions, 1,326 receiving yards, and 11 touchdowns, all of which are school records for tight ends.

College statistics

Professional career
Wilcox signed with the Cincinnati Bengals as an undrafted free agent on April 27, 2020. He gained notoriety following an incident at the NFL combine when he was struck in the face with a football during a catching drill. He was waived during final roster cuts on September 5, 2020, and signed to the practice squad the next day. Wilcox was signed to the Bengals' active roster on January 1, 2021. Wilcox made the Bengals' 53-man roster out of training camp at the start of the 2021 season.

On April 8, 2022, Wilcox re-signed with the Bengals on a one-year contract. In Week 15 of the 2022 season against the Tampa Bay Buccaneers, Wilcox scored his first career touchdown on a 12 yard pass in the red zone.

References

External links
South Florida Bulls bio
Cincinnati Bengals bio

Living people
Players of American football from Florida
American football tight ends
South Florida Bulls football players
Cincinnati Bengals players
1996 births